Philodromus lividus is a spider species found in Europe (Portugal, France, Italy, Croatia) and North Africa (Morocco, Algeria).

See also 
 List of Philodromidae species

References

External links 

lividus
Spiders of Europe
Spiders of Africa
Fauna of Algeria
Fauna of Morocco
Spiders described in 1875